Sewell is an unincorporated community in Fayette County, West Virginia, United States. Sewell was the sight of a major coking operation with 193 beehive coke ovens operating in the late nineteenth century and early to mid twentieth century. The operation was serviced by the Mann's Creek Railroad between 1886 and 1955.

The community was named after Stephen Sewell, a pioneer settler.

References

Unincorporated communities in Fayette County, West Virginia
Unincorporated communities in West Virginia
Coal towns in West Virginia
Ghost towns in West Virginia